The 2007 Colorado Rapids season is the twelfth season of the Colorado club franchise. The team enters the season having been eliminated from the 2006 MLS Playoffs in the Conference Finals. The Rapids, however, enter as the defending champions of the MLS Reserve Division.

For 2007, the Rapids revealed new team colors, uniforms and crest. The Colorado Rapids begin play in their new soccer-specific stadium, Dick's Sporting Goods Park.

Offseason

2006 Colorado Rapids

Changes for the 2007 MLS Season

In
  Ugo Ihemelu Traded from Los Angeles
  Herculez Gomez Traded from Los Angeles
  Nico Colaluca Signed as draft pick
  Omar Cummings Signed as draft pick
  John DiRaimondo Signed as draft pick
  Justin Hughes Signed as draft pick
  Kosuke Kimura Signed as draft pick
  Nick LaBrocca Signed as draft pick
  José Cancela Traded from Toronto FC
  Conor Casey Traded from Toronto FC
  Brandon Prideaux Traded from D.C.
  Zach Thornton Traded from Chicago
  Facundo Erpen Traded from D.C.
  Mehdi Ballouchy Traded from Real Salt Lake
  Daniel Osorno Free Transfer
  Tony Sanneh Traded from Chicago

Out
  Kyle Beckerman Traded to Real Salt Lake for Mehdi Ballouchy
  Greg Vanney Traded to D.C. for Facundo Erpen
  Joe Cannon Traded to Los Angeles
  Matt Crawford Released by team
  Eric Denton Released by team, rights subsequently traded to New York Red Bulls
  Hunter Freeman Traded to New York Red Bulls
  Luchi Gonzalez Released by team, subsequently signed with Miami FC of the USL-1
  Sasha Gotsmanov Released by team, subsequently signed with Minnesota Thunder of the USL-1
  Matt Jordan Released by team
  Aitor Karanka Released by team
  Aaron King Released by team.  Joined Charleston Battery of USL-1
  Thiago Martins Transferred to Bodø/Glimt of the Norwegian Adeccoligaen
  Clint Mathis Traded to New York Red Bulls
  Fabrice Noël Released by team
  Alain Nkong Released by team
  Riley O'Neill Traded to Toronto FC
  Melvin Tarley Released by team, subsequently signed with Puerto Rico Islanders of the USL-1
  Roberto Brown Released by team

2007 MLS SuperDraft

Chance at a comeback

2007 final roster
As of October 21, 2007

(captain)

Western Conference standings

x = Clinched playoff berth
y = Clinched home field for Conf. Champ.

Last Updated 2016-07-19

Results by round

References

External links
2007 Colorado Rapids Schedule
2007 Colorado Rapids Stats

Colorado Rapids seasons
Colorado Rapids
Colorado Rapids
Colorado Rapids